Dino Seremet (born 16 August 1980) is a retired Slovenian footballer.

Career
Seremet also spent loan spells at Tranmere Rovers and Doncaster Rovers, while contracted to Luton Town While on loan to Tranmere, Seremet was their first-choice goalkeeper. He became notable when signing for Luton in July 2004, though Seremet failed to break into the first-team at the English side, making only 6 first-team appearances.

Seremet signed a two-year contract with AEL 1964 in July 2008. He managed to play only in 3 matches and in January 2011 he signed with Doxa Dramas. Although he had a very successful season with 31 appearances, the team was once more relegated from Superleague. In August 2012, he returned to AEL 1964 and signed a one-year contract till the end of the season.

References

External links
 

1980 births
Living people
Slovenian footballers
Slovenian expatriate footballers
Slovenian PrvaLiga players
Super League Greece players
NK Maribor players
Doncaster Rovers F.C. players
Luton Town F.C. players
Association football goalkeepers
A.O. Kerkyra players
Kallithea F.C. players
Athlitiki Enosi Larissa F.C. players
PFC Lokomotiv Plovdiv players
Doxa Drama F.C. players
Panthrakikos F.C. players
Expatriate footballers in Greece
Expatriate footballers in England
Expatriate footballers in Bulgaria
Footballers from Ljubljana